Buchanan Township is one of eleven townships in Atchison County, Missouri, United States. At the 2010 census, its population was 83. The northwest corner of the township is the northwest corner of the entire state.

Buchanan Township was established in 1858, and named after James Buchanan, the 15th President of the United States.

Geography
Buchanan Township covers an area of and contains no incorporated settlements. Buchanan Township has two cemeteries: Union, and Clayton-Lewis. Greys Lake is within this township.

References

 USGS Geographic Names Information System (GNIS)

External links
 US-Counties.com
 City-Data.com

Townships in Atchison County, Missouri
Townships in Missouri